James Dudley Achurch (21 January 1928 – 5 November 2015) was an Australian javelin thrower who competed in the 1956 Summer Olympics. He won the gold medal in the men's javelin throw event at the 1954 British Empire and Commonwealth Games in Vancouver, Canada.

Achurch discovered his talent while growing up on a farm in New South Wales and throwing rocks and rabbits. His father later sold the farm and purchased a tennis center, where James learned to play the game as well.

Over the years, Achurch worked in multiple professions, including running a passionfruit and pineapple farm, as well as a carriage builder, a house painter, and a wardsman, plus running maintenance contracts for Nambour General Hospital.

References

1928 births
2015 deaths
Sportsmen from New South Wales
Australian male javelin throwers
Olympic athletes of Australia
Athletes (track and field) at the 1956 Summer Olympics
Commonwealth Games medallists in athletics
Commonwealth Games gold medallists for Australia
Athletes (track and field) at the 1954 British Empire and Commonwealth Games
Recipients of the Australian Sports Medal
Medallists at the 1954 British Empire and Commonwealth Games